Lord Gardiner may refer to:

 Gerald Gardiner, Baron Gardiner (1900–1990), British Labour politician
 John Gardiner, Baron Gardiner of Kimble (born 1956), British Conservative politician